The Enchanted Forest Chronicles is a series of four young adult fantasy novels by Patricia C. Wrede titled Dealing with Dragons, Searching for Dragons, Calling on Dragons, and Talking to Dragons. Additionally, the Book of Enchantments includes one short story titled Utensile Strength and also includes a short story titled The Princess, the Cat, and the Unicorn which takes place in the Enchanted Forest universe, but does not involve any of the familiar characters. Patricia C. Wrede does "hope" to author a fifth Enchanted Forest novel once her current book contracts have been fulfilled.

Dealing with Dragons and Searching for Dragons were also published in the UK under the titles Dragonsbane and Dragon Search. 

The four books of the Enchanted Forest Chronicles offer adventure along with a female heroine, a witch, a magician, a dragon and many more along with the final one featuring the next generation and a dash of romance as a young man travels through the Enchanted Forest and learns many things.

Synopses

Dealing with Dragons

Princess Cimorene of the kingdom of Linderwall decides that being a princess is too boring and confining, leaves home to work for the dragon Kazul, and discovers and subsequently dissolves a plot by the wizards to take control of the King of the Dragons.

Searching for Dragons

Cimorene meets the King of the Enchanted Forest, Mendanbar. With their new friends, they collaborate to rescue Kazul—now the King of the Dragons—from the wizards who have captured her in the Enchanted Forest.

Calling on Dragons

Morwen discovers that the wizards have stolen Mendanbar's sword, which kept them from stealing the Enchanted Forest's magic, and works with Cimorene to retrieve it.

Talking to Dragons

Daystar, Cimorene and Mendanbar's son, is sent off into the forest with his father's sword and no knowledge of his heritage. It was written and published first, and then revised later to better fit with the prequel books.

Utensile Strength

Mendanbar, Cimorene, and Daystar must determine what to do with the Frying Pan of Doom. This short story occurs after the events of Talking to Dragons.

Main characters

Humans 
 Cimorene - A highly intelligent and strong-willed princess of Linderwall. The youngest of six beautiful sisters, she is unlike them in both personality and physical appearance, being tall and black-haired rather than blonde and petite.
 Zemenar - The Head Wizard of the Society of Wizards, given to being devious and under-handed. Grey-haired with a long, grey beard.
 Antorell -  The son of Zemenar and a fairly incompetent wizard, with brown hair and beard. Antorell is consistently referred to as not being very smart or intimidating, and is easily manipulated by others.
 Morwen - A practical-minded and highly sensible witch who lives in the Enchanted Forest with her nine cats. She is short, with ginger hair and small square glasses. She infuriates Vamist in the third book with her nine cats (he thinks witches should only have one), none of whom are black, and the fact that she grows plain apples in her garden, among other things.
 Telemain - An academic magician whose goal in life is to discover the inner workings of every existing type of magic, and has a particular interest in learning the ways of the very secretive wizards. Moderate height with black hair and beard; has a tendency to indulge in overly long and complex technical explanations.
 Mendanbar - The King of the Enchanted Forest, an intelligent young man who does not particularly enjoy being king or "being 'Your Majestied' every third word". Tall and black-haired, marries Cimorene at the end of the second book.
 Alianora - The Princess of Duchy of Toure-on-Marsh, captured by Woraug, who becomes friends with Cimorene. Petite with apricot colored hair. A major character in the first book.
 Vamist - Arona Michaelear Grinogion Vamist is a middle-aged, balding campaigner for traditional magic, causing many citizens of the world of the Enchanted Forest—including but not limited to fire-witches and witches that have more than one cat—to go into hiding, and forcing the rest to conform to his ideas of normalcy. A major character in the third book who meets a rather humorous end.
 Daystar - Cimorene and Mendabar's only child, fairly tall with black hair like his parents. Daystar is raised in secrecy by Cimorene, thus does not know his heritage, and is greatly confused when the Society of Wizards deems him a threat.
 Shiara - A fire-witch who aids Prince Daystar in his quest. She is not particularly polite, and frequently mouths off or bursts into tears at the slightest hint of stress due to her unstable fire-witch powers. Hinted that Shiara will end up going through princess training (like Cimorene did) to become Prince Daystar's betrothed and Prince Daystar will have to rescue her from her dragon "captor".

Dragons 
 Kazul - A high-ranking female dragon, with bright green scales, whom Cimorene runs away to work for. She becomes King of the dragons in the first book.
 Woraug - A distinctly unpleasant bright green dragon, who apparently dislikes Cimorene from the start.
 Tokoz - King of the Dragons before Kazul; appears only in the first book of the series.
 Roxim - An older dragon with a manner much like a favored uncle. His allergy to wizards (and their staffs) is particularly severe.
 Unnamed young dragon - Kazul's grandchild, arguably her "most irritating" one, and too young to pick a permanent name; travels with Prince Daystar.

Animals 
 Murgatroyd - one of Morwen's cats, male, quiet and reserved attitude.
 Fiddlesticks - one of Morwen's cats, seal brown male, large appetite (particularly for fish), fairly nosy when he's not involved in a conversation.
 Miss Eliza Tudor - one of Morwen's cats, white and fluffy female with blue eyes, as polite as can be expected.
 Scorn - one of Morwen's cats, calico female, lives up to her name, forms a relationship with Horatio.
 Jasmine - one of Morwen's cats, ginger female, lazy.
 Trouble - one of Morwen's cats, a large grey tom with a crooked tail and ragged ear, expresses some jealousy towards Horatio, generally lives up to his name.
 Jasper Darlington Higgins IV - one of Morwen's cats, cream and silver male.
 Chaos - one of Morwen's cats, grey long-haired tabby male, described as fat.
 Aunt Ophelia - one of Morwen's cats, spiky tortoiseshell female, speaks like a Southern Belle.
 Quiz - one of Morwen's cats, a child of Scorn, also known as the Grand Inquisitor. Black and white, possibly a son of Horatio.
 Cassandra - one of Morwen's cats, child of Scorn, grey female, not very noticeable. (Possibly a daughter of Trouble, as Horatio and Scorn would have produced only black and white offspring.)
 Grendel - cat belonging to the witch Archaniz, fat black male, not very intelligent.
 Horatio - cat belonging to Brandel (a fire witch), a black male with white paws and chin, forms a relationship with Scorn.
 Nightwitch - kitten belonging to Shiara, gifted by Morwen to her. She appears similar to Horatio and Quiz, is more than likely one of their descendants.
 Killer - a rabbit that is affected by a number of spells throughout the book Calling on Dragons, by the end being a massive 7-foot 11-inch blue floating insubstantial winged donkey.
 Suz: A small gold (and very energetic) lizard that helps guide Daystar in Talking to Dragons.

Minor characters

Non-dragon people 
Various fairies, elves, giants and dwarves appear throughout the series, and are considered as people.
 Ballimore the Giantess and Dobbilan the Giant - Along with her husband, one of Kazul's and Cimorene's friends. Her Cauldron of Plenty comes in handy several times throughout the series, whether making or simply feeding her 12-headed son-in-law, although it fails at dessert (making only burnt mint custard and sour-cream-and-onion ice cream). Her husband Dobbilan gives up his pillaging lifestyle for consulting after meeting Mendabar. While mentioned several times in other books, she makes her first appearance in Searching for Dragons (along with Dobbilan).
 Herman (the dwarf) - Herman is a descendant of Rumpelstiltskin, with the same talents, but keeps ending up with children after no one was able to remember his name, even after he changed it. He lends Cimorene and Mendabar the use of a scrying window in Searching for Dragons. He is acquainted with Telemain, from whom Herman bought his home.
 Gypsy Jack - A human trader who operates from a multi-colored wagon, specializing in the repair of magical goods; Cimorene and Mendabar make use of this talent when needing repairs for their magic carpet. Jack is a friend of the magician Telemain; first appears in Searching for Dragons.
 Brandel - A human fire-witch who lives in the Smoky Swamp, having moved there to get away from Vamist and his pursuits. Like most fire-witches, he can set his hair ablaze without a thought, usually when he gets worked up and angry over a slight. Brandel aids Morwen and Cimorene in Calling on Dragons.
 Willin - Mendabar's steward, and undoubtedly the hardest-working employee of the castle. Willin is a pleasant elf who enjoys formal occasions and is annoyed when the King leaves without warning (which appears to happen often enough that he has a valid complaint). Willin spends much of his time in the books chastising the King and Queen.
 Archaniz - Chairwitch of the Deadly Nightshade Gardening Club; maintains the "traditional" witch look (black hat, hair, eyes, long nose, etc.). Grows ordinary daisies in her garden (as well as Giant Weaselweeds), and dislikes Vamist's intentions as she believes he will cause witches to be viewed as benevolent instead of maligning (though Morwen is fairly benevolent).
 Wully and Kanikak - Two other witches mentioned briefly as part of the Deadly Nightshade Gardening Club. One grows smokeblossoms and the other Midnight fire-flowers.
 The Stone Prince - A prince, destined to do a great service for a king, who goes on a quest for the Water of Life which is found in the dragons' Caves of Fire and Night, and suffers complications that turn him into living stone. He later marries Alianora, a friend of Cimorene's; he also plays a crucial role in discovering the wizards' plot in the first book. We never learned his real name.
 Therandill -Prince of Sathem-by-the-Mountain. "...golden Haired, blue eyes and exceedingly handsome...", but he "isn't anything else" Cimorene's parents arranged their betrothal against Cimorene's wishes which what was prompted her to leave. (Ch 1 Dealing with Dragons)
 Princess Keredwel of Raxwell - Captive princess of the Dread dragon Gornul. The gold Princess with hair the color of sun ripened wheat.(ch 5 dealing with dragons)
 Princess Hallanna of Poranbuth - Captive of the dread dragon Zareth. The pearl princess with hair the color of ripened apricots.(ch 5 dealing with dragons)
 The Frog -NOT an enchanted prince, he just picked up a few things from them. The frog was critical for his part in making Cimorene realize talk is cheap.

Dragons 
 Marchak - Kazul's useful aide during several events of the books, a middle-sized dragon.

Others 
 Gargoyle - The gargoyle in Mendabar's study frequently yells and curses at him for not listening, which only perpetuates the issue. He is made of wood, unlike the stereotypical gargoyle, and his main peeves seem to be getting wet and possibly rotting, and when no one dusts him.

References

External links

 
Young adult novel series
Fantasy novel series
Fantasy novels by fictional universe
1990s fantasy novels
Books about dragons
Witchcraft in written fiction
Novels based on fairy tales